The Full Sentence is the second and final studio album by Pigeonhed, released on January 28, 1997 through Sub Pop.

Track listing

Personnel
Pigeonhed
Steve Fisk – piano, keyboards, synthesizer, Hammond organ, loops, vibraphone, arrangement, sequencing
Shawn Smith – vocals, drums, drum machine, guitar, keyboards, Hammond organ, mellotron, programming
Additional musicians
Carrie Akre – additional vocals (6, 12)
Jerry Cantrell – guitar (3)
Matt Chamberlain – drums (3, 10), percussion (7, 10)
Helios Creed – guitar (8)
Om Fletcher – additional vocals (6, 12)
Wayne Flower – bass guitar (8)
Greg Freeman – bass guitar (8)
Regan Hagar – drums (10)
Mark Pickerel – drums (8)
Riz Rollins – additional vocals (6, 12)
Cedric Ross – bass guitar (7)
Kim Thayil – guitar (3, 5, 8, 10)
Reggie Watts – additional vocals (6, 12)
Production
Arthur S. Aubry – photography
Greg Calbi – mastering
John Goodmanson – production, engineering
Lance Mercer – photography
Pigeonhed – production

References

External links
 

1997 albums
Pigeonhed albums
Sub Pop albums